The Roman-Germanic Museum (RGM, in German: Römisch-Germanisches Museum) is an archaeological museum in Cologne, Germany. It has a large collection of Roman artifacts from the Roman settlement of Colonia Claudia Ara Agrippinensium, on which modern Cologne is built. The museum protects the original site of a Roman town villa, from which a large Dionysus mosaic remains in its original place in the basement, and the related Roman Road just outside. In this respect the museum is an archaeological site.

The museum also has the task of preserving the Roman cultural heritage of Cologne, and therefore houses an extensive collection of Roman glass from funerals and burials and also exercises archaeological supervision over the construction of the Cologne underground.

Most of the museum's collection was housed at the Wallraf-Richartz Museum in Cologne until 1946. In the front of the museum the former northern town gate of Cologne with the inscription CCAA (for Colonia Claudia Ara Agrippinensium) is on display in the building.

The museum 
The Römisch-Germanisches Museum, which opened in 1974, is near Cologne Cathedral, on the site of a 3rd-century villa. The villa was discovered in 1941 during the construction of an air-raid shelter. On the floor of the main room of the villa is the renowned Dionysus mosaic. Since the mosaic could not be moved easily, the architects Klaus Renner and Heinz Röcke designed the museum around the mosaic. The inner courtyards of the museum mimic the layout of the ancient villa.

In addition to the Dionysus mosaic, which dates from around A.D. 220/230, there is the reconstructed sepulchre of the legionary Poblicius (about A.D. 40). There is also an extensive collection of Roman glassware as well as an array of Roman and medieval jewellery.  Many artefacts of everyday life in Roman Cologne — including portraits (e.g., of Roman emperor Augustus and his wife Livia Drusilla), inscriptions, pottery, and architectural fragments — round out the displays.

On the night of 18 January 2007, Cyclone Kyrill blew a sheet of plywood through the glass front of the museum right onto the Dionysus mosaic. The damage was repaired within a week.

The museum has the world's largest collection of locally produced glass from the Roman period.

See also

 Cage cup
 Conchylia cup
 Roman governors of Germania Inferior

Books 
 Gerta Wolff: The Roman-Germanic Cologne. A Guide to the Roman-Germanic Museum and City of Cologne. J. P. Bachem: Cologne, 2002,

External links
 Römisch-Germanisches Museum
 www.colonia3d.de, computer aided animations and renderings of CCAA  by Köln International School of Design

Sources 

Museums in Cologne
Innenstadt, Cologne
Archaeological museums in Germany
Museums established in 1946
1946 establishments in Germany
Museums of ancient Rome in Germany